Lina Chebil (born 19 July 2005) is a Tunisian footballer who plays for ASF Sousse and the Tunisia national team.

Club career
Chebil has played for Sousse in Tunisia.

International career
Chebil has capped for Tunisia at senior level, including in a 4–0 friendly away win over UAE on 6 October 2021.

See also
 List of Tunisia women's international footballers

References

2005 births
Living people
Tunisian women's footballers
Women's association football forwards
Tunisia women's international footballers
21st-century Tunisian women